Legislative elections were held in South Korea on April 15, 2004.  In the 17th election for the National Assembly, voters elected 299 members of the legislature. The newly formed Uri Party and other parties supporting President Roh Moo-hyun, who was impeached by the outgoing National Assembly, won a majority of seats. This was the first time a centre-left liberal party won a majority in the National Assembly.

Political parties

The newly formed liberal Uri Party (Uri-dang or Our Party) gained support through its opposition to the impeachment of President Roh. It won 32 out of 49 seats in Seoul, 44 out of 62 in Incheon and Gyeonggi, confirming that a majority of voters supported the President Roh.

The conservative Grand National Party, which supported the impeachment of President Roh, suffered a loss of support, but won a majority in North Gyeongsang and South Gyeongsang regions and retained the 100 seats necessary to block constitutional changes.

The progressive, socialist Democratic Labor Party got 13.03% of vote share, but won only 10 out of 299 seats due to the FPTP system. However this was considered as a great triumph considering that political landscape of South Korea is traditionally anti-communist and against left-wing policies. DLP also won two FPTP seats in Ulsan based on the Hyundai labor union.

The Millennium Democratic Party, formerly the major liberal party, was the second-largest party prior to the election but sustained the biggest loss in the backlash following its leading role in the impeachment of Roh, as much of its support shifted to the Uri Party.

The United Liberal Democrats, a conservative regional party based on North Chungcheong and South Chungcheong regions, lost support since its leader, Kim Jong-pil, did not contest the last presidential election.

Results

By region

Notes

Legislative elections in South Korea
South Korea
Parliamentary elections
Parliamentary